José Antonio Ríos Granados (December 2, 1958 – October 2, 2007) was a Mexican politician, actor, and film maker who served as the municipal president of Tultitlán (State of México) from 2000 until 2003.  Born in Mexico City, he attended the National Autonomous University of Mexico.
he was a member of the National Action Party (PAN).

Ríos Granados became known for a number of political scandals during his tenure as mayor of Tultitlán.  One of the scandals involved Ríos appearing in a movie alongside Mexican actress Lorena Herrera while serving as a sitting mayor.

Ríos was killed in a small plane crash in Atizapán de Zaragoza on October 2, 2007.

External links
El Universal: José Antonio Ríos Granados obituary 
Noticieras Televisa Mexico: José Antonio Ríos Granados plane crash 

1958 births
2007 deaths
Municipal presidents in the State of Mexico
Mexican male actors
Victims of aviation accidents or incidents in Mexico
National Action Party (Mexico) politicians
Mexican actor-politicians
People from Mexico City